Sally was launched in 1782 at Liverpool as a West Indiaman. She made one voyage as a whaler and one as an East Indiaman sailing to Bengal under charter to the British East India Company (EIC). After a storm damaged her in 1805 as she was on her way in 1805 from Liverpool to Africa as a slave ship she had to put into Barbados where she was condemned.

Career
Sally first appeared in Lloyd's Register (LR) in 1782 with J.Corning, master, changing to J.Corbett, J.Chorley & Co., owners, and trade Liverpool–Tortola.

Whaling voyage (1791–1792): Captain John Meader sailed from Liverpool in 1791 (probably on 29 March 1791), bound for Walvis Bay. Sally returned on 19 November 1792.

After Sally returned from whaling, Captain John Woods resumed command. On 11 January 1794 Captain John Woods acquired a letter of marque. 

EIC voyage (1795–1796): Captain Robert Brown acquired a letter of marque on 7 August 1795. Before she sailed, Sally underwent repairs. Sally sailed from Liverpool on 7 September, bound for Bengal. She was at Rio de Janeiro on 14 November, and arrived at Calcutta on 24 February 1796. Homeward bound, she was at Culpee on 2 April, reached St Helena on 23 July and Crookhave on 27 November, before arriving at the Downs on 12 December.

After Sally returned to England, Captain John Woods resumed command. He acquired a letter of marque on 12 January 1798.

Fate
Captain Charles Kneale sailed Sally from Liverpool on 5 August 1805. The Trans Atlantic Slave Trade Database states that she was "shipwrecked or destroyed, before slaves embarked". Lloyd's List (LL) reported on 10 December that Sally, Neale, master, from Liverpool to Africa, had put into Barbados dis-masted and that she had been condemned.

Notes

Citations

References
 
 
 
 

1782 ships
Age of Sail merchant ships of England
Whaling ships
Ships of the British East India Company
Liverpool slave ships
Maritime incidents in 1805